is a Japanese football player. He plays for Vanraure Hachinohe.

Playing career
Naoyuki Yamada joined MIO Biwako Shiga in 2010. In 2013, he moved to Blaublitz Akita.

Club statistics
Updated to 26 December 2021.

Honours
 Blaublitz Akita
 J3 League (2): 2017, 2020

References

External links
Profile at Blaublitz Akita

1987 births
Living people
Biwako Seikei Sport College alumni
Association football people from Osaka Prefecture
Japanese footballers
J3 League players
Japan Football League players
MIO Biwako Shiga players
Blaublitz Akita players
Vanraure Hachinohe players
Association football defenders